Races at the Nürburgring were held with Grand Prix cars, Grand Prix motorcycles, various Formula cars, Sports cars, touring cars, trucks, and even bicycles, like the 1927, 1966, and 1978 UCI Road World Championships.

Automobile races

Grand Prix racing
Races with Grand Prix cars have been held at the Nürburgring since its inauguration in 1927. Besides the German Grand Prix, also Eifelrennen races were held with GP cars. With the German Grand Prix being almost exclusively held at Hockenheimring from 1977 to 2008, additional Formula One races in Germany were called either European Grand Prix or Luxembourg Grand Prix. In 2020, a new Eifel Grand Prix was held at the venue as part of a re-arrangement of the season as a result of the COVID-19 pandemic.

A pink background indicates an event which was not part of the Formula One World Championship.
A yellow background indicates an event which was part of the pre-war European Championship.

6 Hours of Nürburgring/1000 km of Nürburgring

The 6 Hours of Nürburgring (formerly the Nürburgring 1000 km) is an endurance race for sports cars held on the Nürburgring in Germany and organized by the ADAC since 1953.

1 – 1974 Race scheduled for 750 km only

2 – 1981 Race stopped after 17 laps due to fatal accident of Herbert Müller which caused track damage

3 – 1986 Race was stopped due to torrential rain and only ran approximately 600 km.

4 – Time limit reached before 1,000 km distance was completed (six hours for the Le Mans Series and Blancpain Endurance Series races, the 2010 Oldtimers Festival race had a seven-hour time limit).

24 Hours of Nürburgring
List of 24 Hours Nürburgring winners

Sports car races 

 6 Hours of Nürburgring / 1000 km Nürburgring (1953, 1956–1991, 2000, 2004–2017)
 24 Hours Nürburgring (1970–present)
 Veranstaltergemeinschaft Langstreckenpokal Nürburgring (1977–present)
 BPR Global GT Series (1995–1996)
 FIA GT Championship (1997, 2001, 2010)
 FIA Sportscar Championship (1998, 2001)

Touring car races 

 Deutsche Tourenwagen Masters (2000–present)
 European Touring Car Championship (1963–1980, 1982–1986, 1988, 2001)
 World Touring Car Championship (1987, 2015–present)

Motorcycle races 

 German motorcycle Grand Prix (1955, 1958, 1965, 1968, 1970, 1972, 1974, 1976, 1978, 1980, 1984, 1986, 1988, 1990, 1995–1997)
 Superbike World Championship (1998–1999, 2008–2013)

Cycling races 

 UCI Road World Championships (1927, 1966, 1978)
 Rad am Ring (2003–present)

References 

Motorsport in Germany
Race results at motorsport venues